The 2017 FIBA 3x3 World Tour Utsunomiya Masters was a 3x3 basketball tournament held in Utsunomiya, Japan at a temporary venue constructed at the Futaarayama Jinja shrine from July 29–30, 2017. It was the second stop on the 2017 FIBA 3x3 World Tour. The top team, Novi Sad Al-Wahda qualified for the 2017 FIBA 3x3 World Tour Final.

Participants
12 teams qualified to participate at the Utsunomiya Masters. Team Ljubljana was hard seeded for the tournament, but finished 2nd at the Nanjing 3x3 Challenger, thus the third place finisher Team Ulaanbaatar qualified. Ljubljana also won the World Hoops 3x3 Challenger, thus the third place finisher Team Krakow qualified.

Preliminary round

Pool A

|}

Pool B

|}

Pool C

|}

Pool D

|}

Final Round

Final standings

References

External links
Utsunomiya Masters Official Website

2017 FIBA 3x3 World Tour
International basketball competitions hosted by Japan
2017 in Japanese sport
Utsunomiya